Matrix metalloproteinase-12 (MMP-12) also known as macrophage metalloelastase (MME) or macrophage elastase (ME) is an enzyme that in humans is encoded by the MMP12 gene.

Function
Proteins of the matrix metalloproteinase (MMP) family are involved in the breakdown of extracellular matrix in normal physiological processes, such as embryonic development, reproduction, and tissue remodeling, as well as in disease processes, such as arthritis and metastasis.  Most MMP's are secreted as inactive proproteins.  The prodomain is cleaved by extracellular proteinases when the enzyme is activated.  The active enzyme is constituted by two domains, the catalytic domain responsible for its enzymatic activity and the hemopexin-like domain that in some MMPs plays a role in substrate recognition and can contribute to increasing catalytic efficiency.  It is thought that the protein encoded by this gene is cleaved at both ends to yield the active enzyme, but this processing has not been fully described. The enzyme degrades soluble and insoluble elastin.  The gene is part of a cluster of MMP genes which localize to chromosome 11q22.3.

Clinical significance
MMP12 may play a role in aneurysm formation and studies in mice and humans suggest a role in the development of emphysema.

References

Further reading

External links
 The MEROPS online database for peptidases and their inhibitors: M10.009
 PDBe-KB provides an overview of all the structure information available in the PDB for Human Macrophage metalloelastase (MMP12)

Matrix metalloproteinases
Human proteins
EC 3.4.24